Mazut is a low-quality heavy fuel oil, used in power plants and similar applications. In the United States and Western Europe, by using FCC or RFCC processes, mazut is blended or broken down, with the end product being diesel.
Mazut may be used for heating houses in the former USSR and in countries of the Far East that do not have the facilities to blend or break it down into more conventional petro-chemicals. In the West, furnaces that burn mazut are commonly called "waste oil" heaters or "waste oil" furnaces.

There have been signs of mazut burning in Iran to compensate for the shortage of natural gas but it has caused environmental problems notably causing huge amounts of air pollution in big cities such as Tehran.

Mazut-100 is a fuel oil that is manufactured to GOST specifications, for example, GOST 10585-75 (not active) or GOST 10585-2013 (active as per December 2019). Mazut is almost exclusively manufactured in Russia, Kazakhstan, Azerbaijan, and Turkmenistan. This product is typically used for larger boilers in producing steam, since the energy value is high.

The most important factor when grading this fuel is the sulfur content, which can mostly be affected by the source feedstock. For shipment purposes, this product is considered a "dirty oil" product, and because viscosity drastically affects whether it is able to be pumped, shipping has unique requirements. Mazut is much like No. 6 fuel oil (Bunker C) and is part of the products left over after gasoline and lighter components are evaporated from the crude oil.

Different types of Mazut-100 

The main difference between the different types of Mazut-100 is the content of sulphur. The grades are represented by these sulfuric levels:
 "Very low sulphur" is mazut with a sulphur content of 0.5%
 "Low sulphur" is a mazut with a sulphur content of 0.5–1.0%
 "Normal sulphur" is a mazut with a sulphur content of 1.0–2.0%
 "High sulphur" is a mazut with a sulphur content of 2.0–3.5%

Very-low-sulphur mazut is generally made from the lowest-sulfur crude feedstocks. It has a very limited volume to be exported because:
 The number of producers in Russia is limited. Refineries that produce this are generally owned by the largest domestic oil companies, such as Lukoil and Rosneft, etc.
 In Russia and the CIS countries a minimum of 50% from the total produced volume is sold only to domestic consumers in Russia and the CIS.
 Most of the remainder amount is reserved by state quotas for state-controlled companies abroad.
 The remaining volume available for export is sold according to state quotas, via state auctions, accessible only to Russian domestic companies.

Low- to high-sulfur mazut is available from Russia and other CIS countries (Kazakhstan, Azerbaijan, Turkmenistan). The technical specifications are represented in the same way, according to the Russian GOST 10585-99. The Russian origin mazut demands higher prices.

References

Oils
Petroleum products
Petroleum in the Soviet Union